A heteromer is something that consists of different parts; the antonym of homomeric. Examples are:

Biology
 Spinal neurons that pass over to the opposite side of the spinal cord.
 A protein complex that contains two or more different polypeptides.

Pharmacology
 Ligand-gated ion channels such as the nicotinic acetylcholine receptor and GABAA receptor are composed of five subunits arranged around a central pore that opens to allow ions to pass through. There are many different subunits available that can come together in a wide variety of combinations to form different subtypes of the ion channel. Sometimes the channel can be made from only one type of subunit, such as the α7 nicotinic receptor, which is made up from five α7 subunits, and so is a homomer rather than a heteromer, but more commonly several different types of subunit will come together to form a heteromeric complex (e.g., the α4β2 nicotinic receptor, which is made up from two α4 subunits and three β2 subunits). Because the different ion channel subtypes are expressed to different extents in different tissues, this allows selective modulation of ion transport and means that a single neurotransmitter can produce varying effects depending on where in the body it is released.
 G protein-coupled receptors are composed of seven membrane-spanning alpha-helical segments that are usually linked together into a single folded chain to form the receptor complex. However, research has demonstrated that a number of GPCRs are also capable of forming heteromers from a combination of two or more individual GPCR subunits under some circumstances, especially where several different GPCRs are densely expressed in the same neuron. Such heteromers may be between receptors from the same family (e.g., adenosine A1/A2A heteromers and dopamine D1/D2 and D1/D3 heteromers) or between entirely unrelated receptors such as CB1/A2A, glutamate mGluR5 / adenosine A2A heteromers, cannabinoid CB1 / dopamine D2 heteromers, and even CB1/A2A/D2 heterotrimers where three different receptors have come together to form a heteromer. The ligand binding properties and intracellular trafficking pathways of GPCR heteromers usually show elements from both parent receptors, but may also produce quite unexpected pharmacological effects, making such heteromers an important focus of current research.

See also 
 GPCR oligomer

References

Biochemistry
Proteins